Ritz Cinema may refer to:

Ritz Cinema, Barrow-in-Furness, Cumbria, England
Ritz Cinema, Harringay, London, England
Ritz Cinema, Thirsk, North Yorkshire, England
Ritz Cinema, Nuneaton, Warwickshire, England
Ritz Cinema, Randwick, Sydney, Australia

See also 
Ritz Theatre (disambiguation)
Ritzy Cinema, Brixton, London